Enrico "Heini" Bacher (27 December 1940 – 18 November 2021) was an Italian ice hockey player who competed at the 1964 Winter Olympics. He played eight games and scored three goals.

He died on 18 November 2021, at the age of 80.

References

1940 births
2021 deaths
Olympic ice hockey players of Italy
Ice hockey players at the 1964 Winter Olympics
Bolzano HC players
People from Waidbruck
Sportspeople from Südtirol